Semmelknödel are a kind of bread dumplings made from dried wheat bread rolls like Kaiser rolls, milk, and eggs. The name derives from southern Germany, where semmel means bread rolls and knödel refers to something that has been kneaded. Semmelknödel are a food specialty in southern Germany, Austria and the Czech Republic, as well as northern Italy (where they are called "Canederli" in Trentino, "Semmelknödel" in Südtirol and "Maracund" in Lombardy).

Preparation
Stale (hard) white bread is cut into thin slices or cubes, and softened with hot milk. The dough is then mixed with parsley, egg, and some salt. Bread crumbs can be used to thicken the dough as this depends on how old and dried the bread rolls were. Some ingredients, especially onions, vary depending on the region where it's prepared.

See also
 Knödel
 List of German dishes
 Austrian cuisine

References

Dumplings
German cuisine
Austrian cuisine
Italian cuisine
Czech cuisine
Slovak cuisine
Hungarian cuisine